Antonio Felipe (born 1996) is an American politician. He was first elected to the Connecticut House of Representatives in a 2019 special election.

Antonio Felipe's father Ruben worked for Bill Finch during Finch's term as mayor of Bridgeport, Connecticut. Antonio was raised in Bridgeport, and attends Housatonic Community College. He managed the political campaigns of state representative Christopher Rosario and city councillor Maria Viggiano. He first ran at age 23 in a special election to replace Ezequiel Santiago who died in office. Felipe defeated Republican Party candidate Joshua Parrow, and three Democratic Party candidates, among them former state legislators Héctor A. Díaz and Christina Ayala, as well as Kate Rivera. Felipe was the youngest candidate in the special election, and drew criticism for having to move back to Bridgeport to contest the election, as he and his family had relocated to Stratford one year prior. Felipe assumed office on May 13, 2019. Along with Dennis Bradley, he is the first person of Dominican ancestry to be elected to the Connecticut General Assembly. He faced Kelvin Ayala in the 2020 Democratic Party primary for the 130th house district.

References

1996 births
American politicians of Dominican Republic descent
Hispanic and Latino American state legislators in Connecticut
Living people
Democratic Party members of the Connecticut House of Representatives
21st-century American politicians
Politicians from Bridgeport, Connecticut